Virgil Williams is an American television producer and writer. He began working in television as a writer for 24 and wrote a single episode of the first season in 2002. He was hired as a story editor for 24 day 2 in fall 2002. He wrote two episodes of the second season and returned as a writer for the third season contributing one more episode. He left 24 having scripted four episodes and joined the crew of ER.

He became a co-producer and writer for the twelfth season of ER in 2005. He wrote two episodes for the season, "Two Ships" and "Strange Bedfellows". He was promoted to producer and writer for the thirteenth season and wrote two further episodes, "Jigsaw" and "From Here to Paternity". He was promoted again to supervising producer for the fourteenth season. He wrote three episodes "Gravity", "Believe the Unseen", and "Tandem Repeats". He remained a supervising producer for the fifteenth and final season and wrote two further episodes entitled "Oh, Brother" and "Separation Anxiety". In 2011, he joined the writer staff of Criminal Minds, for which he wrote ten episodes and held the rank of a co-executive producer. In 2017, he signed a deal with Universal Television.

He received a nomination for the Academy Award for Best Adapted Screenplay in 2017 for co-writing the film Mudbound along with director Dee Rees. The film is adapted from the novel of the same name by Hillary Jordan.

References

External links
 

Living people
American television writers
American male television writers
Year of birth missing (living people)